Environment and Behavior is a bimonthly peer-reviewed academic journal covering the fields of environmental psychology and environmental studies. The editor-in-chief is Stanley T. Asah (University of Washington). It was established in 1969 and is published by SAGE Publications. The journal explains different threats the environment experiences.

Abstracting and indexing 
The journal is abstracted and indexed in Scopus, PsycINFO and the Social Sciences Citation Index. According to the Journal Citation Reports, its 2019 impact factor is 5.141

References

External links 
 

SAGE Publishing academic journals
English-language journals
Environmental social science journals
Psychology journals
Environmental studies journals
Publications established in 1969
10 times per year journals